Onkaparinga Valley Road is a South Australian secondary road, connecting the towns of Birdwood, Woodside, Balhannah and Verdun within the Adelaide Hills. It is designated part of route B34.

Major intersections
Onkaparinga Valley Road is entirely contained within the Adelaide Hills Council local government area.

See also

References

Roads in South Australia